Acts of God is the second studio album by the Indianapolis-based progressive metal band At War With Self.

Track listing

 "Acts Of God" (Glenn Snelwar) – 3:37  
 "911" (Snelwar, Damon Trotta) – 5:03  
 "Threads" (Snelwar, Trotta) – 6:02  
 "Ursa Minor" (Snelwar, Trotta, James vonBuelow) – 6:48  
 "End In Blue" (Snelwar, Trotta) – 7:24  
 "Martyr" (Snelwar, Trotta) – 6:35  
 "No Place" (Snelwar, Trotta) – 7:44  
 "Choke Loud" (Snelwar, Trotta, VonBuelow) – 4:19  
 "Refugee" (Snelwar, Mark Sunshine, Trotta) – 8:34

Personnel

Band members 

 Glenn Snelwar - electric and acoustic guitars, mandolins, keyboards, e-bow, string arrangements, programming

Guest musicians 

Damon Trotta - bass guitar, vocals, synths, resonator guitars, e-bow, didgeridoo, programming
Mark Sunshine - vocals
Dave Archer - synths
James Von Buelow - guitars, programming
Steve Decker - drums
Manfred Dikkers - drums, percussion

External links
Acts of God by At War With Self @ Encyclopaedia Metallum
AT WAR WITH SELF music reviews & MP3 @ progarchives.com
Acts of God by At War With Self @ Glenn Snelwar's official website
Sluggo's Goon Music

2007 albums
At War with Self albums